Mansle is a former commune in the Charente department in southwestern France. It is about 20 km north of Angoulême on the main N10 road. On 1 January 2023, it was merged into the new commune of Mansle-les-Fontaines.

Population

Notable people 
 Roger Erell

See also
Communes of the Charente department

References

Former communes of Charente
Angoumois